Mark Tapio Kines (born 1970, Danvers, Massachusetts) is an American film director, writer, producer and owner of Los Angeles-based Cassava Films. Kines is perhaps best known for being the first filmmaker to employ crowdfunding to partially finance a film.

Biography
Kines grew up in Cupertino, California. In 1989, he began studying film and experimental animation at California Institute of the Arts and graduated in 1992 with a BFA in film, with emphasis in experimental animation. After graduating, Kines moved to Los Angeles and began working full-time as a graphic designer, including a four-year stint at Paramount Pictures in Hollywood where he worked as art director for the official Star Trek and Entertainment Tonight websites.

Foreign Correspondents and the dawn of crowdfunding 

In 1996 Kines began writing what would become his first feature film, Foreign Correspondents. The film went into production in 1997, was released in 1999, and received distribution in 2001. The film was shot on 35mm and had a $500,000 budget.

The film stars Melanie Lynskey, Wil Wheaton, Corin Nemec and Yelena Danova and is split into two entirely separate stories, the first entitled "Dear Jenny" and the second "Love, Trevor."

After principal photography was completed, Kines and his producer did not have the money to finish the film. Kines then designed a website for the film, which raised over $125,000 in investments and donations during 1998. Kines was thus the first filmmaker in history to utilize crowdfunding to help finance a feature.

Foreign Correspondents was shown at several film festivals across the world and received mostly positive reviews. It was distributed independently on DVD by Kines and his producer.

Claustrophobia 

In January 2002 Kines began writing Claustrophobia. It had only three main speaking roles, which were given to Melanie Lynskey, Sheeri Rappaport, and Mary Lynn Rajskub. Judith O'Dea (who had starred in the classic zombie film Night of the Living Dead) also appeared in a small, non-speaking role.

The film was distributed in North America in 2004 by Lionsgate Home Entertainment, who changed the title to Serial Slayer.

The Closest Thing to Time Travel 
In late 2005, Kines entered a pitch in a one-minute film competition sponsored by stock photo company Getty Images. His pitch, a bittersweet sci fi-tinged tone poem entitled The Closest Thing to Time Travel, was selected as one of only 30 pitches (out of over 240 entries) to be turned into short films using Getty stock footage material. In early 2006 Kines finished his film, and when the competition was open to the public for final voting, The Closest Thing to Time Travel won Kines the Grand Prize of $10,000 and trips to New York City, Chicago, and Bozeman, Montana, where Kines was a speaker at HATCHfest.

Other work
Since 2005, Kines has been working as a freelance copywriter, creating trivia-based content for the Blu-ray releases of several major studio films, and for the well-received end credit sequence for the 2010 comedy The Other Guys.

Kines has also written and/or directed several short films after The Closest Thing to Time Travel, including Portrait of a Pensive Lady (2008), Party Pooper (2008), and Ron and Nancy (2010).

In 2013, Kines authored and hosted an online screenwriting course on Lynda.com.

In 2015, Kines crowdfunded a short film called 20 Matches. It was screened at several major film festivals in 2016, including Seattle International Film Festival, Nashville Film Festival, Bucheon International Fantastic Film Festival, Ashland Independent Film Festival and Sarasota Film Festival.

Filmography
Foreign Correspondents (1999)
Serial Slayer aka Claustrophobia (2003)

References
Cassavafilms.com
Lynda.com's Screenwriting Fundamentals course
FilmJerk.com Interview with Dark Savant (2001)
Horror Asylum Interview with Phil Davies Brown (2004)

Film producers from California
1970 births
Living people
People from Cupertino, California
Film directors from California